Norwegian Red (Norwegian: Norsk rødt fe)  is a breed of dairy cattle developed in Norway since 1935. Since the 1970s, breeders strongly emphasized functional and production traits resulting in excellent production combined with world-leading performance in health and fertility traits. Norwegian Red cows can have either a red and white or black coat and have a high proportion of genetically polled animals.

Purpose and history 
Norwegian Red (NRF) is a dairy breed that has been selected for a broad breeding objective, with increasing emphasis on functional traits like health and fertility. Norwegian Red was in 1935 through crosses of dairy breeds with several Scandinavian breeds, including the Norwegian Red-and-White, Red Trondheim and the Red Polled Østland. By the mid-1970s it became the dominant breed in its native country, comprising 98% of the cattle population. Semen is exported to more than 30 different countries for crossbreeding and is very popular to cross with Holstein cattle in the U.S. dairy industry. Geno Breeding and A.I. Association, a cooperative organization owned by Norwegian dairy farmers, is the breeding organization for the Norwegian Red.

Norwegian Dairy Herd Recording System 
Owners of Norwegian Red cattle in Norway participate in a comprehensive registry system called the Norwegian Dairy Herd Recording System. Norwegian farmers have been recording data in the comprehensive recording system since the 1960s. This system collects all of the information about each cow in Figure 1.

Minecraft
According to the developers of 2009 sandbox video game Minecraft, the in-game cow model is based on this breed.

Characteristics

Size and Weight 
Growth traits are also included in the index, and young sires for progeny testing have a growth rate of approximately 1.4 kg/day.

Fertility and health 
Fertility was first included in the Norwegian Red breeding program in 1971. The Norwegian Red is likely the most fertile breed of dairy cattle in the world due to the selection of breeding and genetics for increase fertility for more than 40 years.

Calving ease has been included in the selection program since 1978. The Norwegian Red is characterized as a breed with a low frequency of calving difficulties. Less than 2% of the calvings are reported as having major calving difficulties. Stillbirths are also included in the index, and less than 3% of Norwegian Red calves are stillborn.

Health traits have been included in the net merit index since 1978. Currently mastitis and other diseases (in particular ketosis, milk fever, and retained placenta) are included in the breeding program. Although these are low heritability traits, progeny testing based on a high number of daughters provides a selection index with high accuracy. Progeny testing for mastitis is currently based on approximately 300 daughters.

Polled 
Norwegian Reds may be either polled or horned. Currently 40% of the calves in Norway are born polled (genetically without horns). Systematic selection of polled sons after polled elite sires during recent years have increased the frequency of polled animals.

Genetics

Total Merit Index (TMI) 
Norwegian Red bulls are ranked based on the Total Merit Index (TMI). The Norwegian Red TMI is based on 11 traits that are weighted. The TMI is adjusted based on the decision of the board of Geno Breeding and A.I. Association, which is composed of 41 representatives who gather input from farmers and people involved in the dairy cattle industry of Norway.

The most recent update of the TMI became effective on June 1, 2015. This update placed slightly more emphasis on udder conformation and resistance to diseases other than mastitis. There will still be a large emphasis placed on fertility and health.

Geno Group 
Geno SA is the breeding association of the Norwegian Red Cattle. Norsk Rødt Fe (NRF), established in 1935, changed its name to Geno in 1999. Since then, Geno has continued to grow and has expanded to international markets. Geno Global AS was established in 2003 to handle the expansion. Companies that are included in the Geno Group include Geno Turkey, Xsires, SpermVital AS, and Cryogenetics AS.

Evidence of crossbreeding with Norwegian Red 

Because the Norwegian Red breed has been bred since the 1960s to increase heritable traits such as health and fertility, the Norwegian Red is a very suitable breed to crossbreed other cattle breeds with. Various studies and published articles show that when other dairy cattle breeds, particularly Holsteins, are crossed with Norwegian Reds, the offspring will have superior fertility, mastitis resistance, calving ease and survival rates.

University of Minnesota, Department of Animal Sciences 
Short communication: Fertility, somatic cell score, and production of Normande x Holstein, Montbéliarde x Holstein, and Scandinavian Red x Holstein crossbreeds versus pure Holsteins during their first 5 lactations

Abbreviated Summary: Scandinavian Red x Holstein crossbred animals had fewer days to first breeding, enhanced first-service conception rates, higher pregnancy rates, and 12 to 26 fewer days open than did pure Holstein cows during their first 5 lactations. Therefore, the Scandinavian Red is a candidate breed for crossbreeding with Holstein to improve fertility and udder health of herds with higher mean production.

Dairy Production Research Centre, Moorepark, Ireland 
Differences in udder health and immune response traits of Holstein-Friesians, Norwegian Reds, and their crosses in second lactation

Abbreviated Summary: The objective of this study was to investigate potential differences in udder health and immune response traits among Holstein-Friesian (HF), Norwegian Red (NR), and NR x HF (NRX) cows on 30 commercial Irish dairy farms. Results highlight the superiority of the NR with regard to udder health and suggest that improvements to udder health may result from crossbreeding with the NR.

Agri-Food and Biosciences Institute, United Kingdom 
Calving traits, milk production, body condition, fertility, and survival of Holstein-Friesian and Norwegian Red dairy cattle on commercial dairy farms over 5 lactations

Abbreviated Summary: The objective of this summary was to compare calving traits, BCS, milk production, fertility, and survival of Holstein-Friesian (HF) and Norwegian Red (NR) dairy cattle in moderate-concentrate input systems. Norwegian Red cows had a lower calving difficulty score than HF cows when calving for the first and second time, but not for the third or fourth time. At first calving, the incidence of stillbirths for NR cows was 4% compared with 13% for HF cows. Holstein-Friesian cows had a higher full-lactation milk yield than NR cows, whereas NR cows produced milk with a higher milk fat and protein content. Norwegian Red cows had a lower somatic cell score than HF cows during all lactations. Conception rates to first artificial insemination were higher with the NR cows during lactations 1 to 4 (57.8 vs 40.9%, respectively), with 28.5% of HF cows and 11.8% of NR cows culled as infertile before lactation 6. In general, NR cows outperformed HF cows in traits that have been historically included in the NR breeding program.

See also

References

External links

 Performance and Profitability of F1 Norwegian Red X Holstein Cattle As Compared with Pure Holsteins on Commercial Dairy Farms, USDA Agricultural Research Service

Cattle breeds originating in Norway
Cattle breeds
Red cattle